Petriș is a commune in Arad County, Romania, is situated in the contact zone of Mureș Couloir with Metaliferi Mountains. The administrative territory of the commune is approximately 13,100 ha. It is composed of six villages: Corbești (Maroshollód), Ilteu (Iltő), Obârșia (Óborsa), Petriș (situated at 106 km from Arad), Roșia Nouă (Rósa) and Seliște (Marosszeleste).

Population
According to the last census, the population of the commune counts 1871 inhabitants, out of which 99.1% are Romanians, 0.5% are Hungarians and 0.4% are of other or undeclared nationalities.

History
The first documentary records of Petriș, Corbești, Ilteu and Roșia Nouă date back to 1743. Obârșia was attested documentarily in 1468, while Seliște in 1479.

Economy
The commune's present-day economy can be characterized by a powerful dynamic force with significant developments in
all the sectors. Pomiculture and silviculture are well represented on local level. Besides, the commune is abundant in
exploitable mineral resources, such as pyrites in Roșia Nouă.

Tourism
Among the touristic sights of the commune are the complex of the Salbek castle (19th century) - today being
a sanatorium for treating pneumophysiological diseases, the wooden church called "Nașterea Maicii Domnului" built in
1800 in Corbești, the wooden church named "Sfântul Mucenic Dimitrie" built in 1809 and painted in 1819 in Roșia Nouă
and the castle built in the 18-19th centuries in neoclassical style of Ilteu.

References

Communes in Arad County
Localities in Crișana